Chromosome 5 open reading frame 45 is a protein that in humans is encoded by the C5orf45 gene. The orthologue in mice is 3010026O09Rik.

Model organisms
			
Model organisms have been used in the study of C5orf45 function. A conditional knockout mouse line, called 3010026O09Riktm1a(EUCOMM)Wtsi was generated as part of the International Knockout Mouse Consortium program — a high-throughput mutagenesis project to generate and distribute animal models of disease to interested scientists.

Male and female animals underwent a standardized phenotypic screen to determine the effects of deletion. Twenty five tests were carried out on mutant mice and one significant abnormality was observed: male homozygote mutants were infertile.

References

Further reading 
 

Human proteins
Genes mutated in mice